Morayo Afolabi-Brown is a TV Host and the only daughter of the late Nigeria Bar Association President, Alao Aka-Bashorun. She was the deputy director of Programmes at TVC News and host of the breakfast show Your View before she resigned in May 2019.

Early life 
Morayo Afolabi-Brown studied Political Science at Rutgers University, the State University of New Jersey. Growing up, she modelled herself after her mother before she was inspired by the books she read about Abike Dabiri, Ngozi Okonjo-Iweala, Ibukun Awosika, Oprah Winfrey, and Chimamanda Ngozi Adichie, and watching their speeches.

Career 
Afolabi-Brown began her career in the media in 2005 as a Client Service Manager at CMC Connect (a PR Company), before she moved to CUE Media, a content development company as the Head of Content and Development, and later became a Senior Executive, Marketing and Research. She is behind many concepts like Girlfriends (TV drama series), Changing Lives (Talk Show), and Shop Easy. She once worked as a Business Development Manager and later became Head of Content and Channels Acquisition at HiTV, Nigeria's first indigenous cable station provider before she was hired as deputy director of Programmes at TVC.

Recognition 
In 2020, Afolabi-Brown was named as one of the 25 most powerful women in journalism in Nigeria, where she ranked 18th on the list compiled by Women in Journalism Africa.

References

Living people
Rutgers University alumni
Place of birth missing (living people)
Nigerian television presenters
Nigerian women television presenters
Year of birth missing (living people)